The Jerilderie Football Netball Club is an Australian rules football and netball club based in Jerilderie, a town in the Riverina region of New South Wales.

The club teams currently compete in the Picola & District FNL, which Jerilderie FNC joined in 2008 following the dissolution of the Coreen & District Football League in 2007 after 99 years of existence.

History
The first recorded match that Jerilderie FC played in was against the Berrigan FC in Jerilderie August, 1891, which resulted in a draw. After the game the Jerilderie hosted Berrigan at White's Courthouse Hotel.

In 1928, the Jerilderie Juveniles: 11.14 – 80 defeated Tocumwal: 2.7 – 19 to retain the Resch's Cup.

The club won three Murray Football League premierships in 1983, 1987 and 1989.

The club won three premierships in the Coreen & District Football League in 1999, 2000, 2003.

They won the Picola & District Football League Preimership in 2009, 2012, 2013 and 2014 in the North West Division

Former Jerilderie players who went onto play VFL / AFL include – 
1964 – Mick Dowdle – North Melbourne
1971 – Peter Stephens – Geelong
1986 – Billy Brownless – Geelong

Several former VFL/AFL players have coached Jerilderie FC that include – 
 Graham Cooper – Hawthorn. Coached Jerilderie in 1966.
 Russell Jeffrey – St. Kilda & Brisbane Bears.

Premierships
Southern Riverina Football Association (1905–1931)
 Nil
Murray Valley Second Eighteen Football Association 2nd XVIII (1932–1956)
 1933, 1934, 1937, 1938, 1951, 
Coreen & District Football League (1957–1963)
 1963
Murray Football League (1964–1993)
1983, 1987, 1989
Coreen & District Football League (1994–2007)
 1999, 2000, 2003
Picola & District Football League (NW) (2008–present)
2009, 2012, 2013, 2014

References

External links
 
 Gameday website

Picola & District Football League clubs
2008 establishments in Australia
Australian rules football clubs in New South Wales
Netball teams in New South Wales